Nuritamburia phyllanthana is a moth of the family Tortricidae. It was first described by Otto Swezey in 1940. It is endemic to the Hawaiian island of Oahu.

The larvae feed on Phyllanthus sandwicensis. The larvae are green. They feed between spun-together leaves of their host plant.

External links

Archipini
Endemic moths of Hawaii